Richard Shaw may refer to:

Politicians
Richard Shaw (Dorset MP) (fl. 1533–1563), MP for Poole, Melcombe Regis and Wareham
Richard Shaw (Liberal politician) (1825–1876), British Member of Parliament for Burnley, 1868–1876
Richard G. Shaw (born 1943), West Virginia insurance commissioner

Sports
Ricky Shaw (born 1965), American football player
Richard Shaw (footballer) (born 1968), English footballer and assistant manager at Coventry City

Others
Richard Shawe (fl. 1361–1403), Canon of Windsor
Richard Norman Shaw (1831–1912), British architect
Richard J. Shaw (died 1958), American architect
Richard Shaw (artist) (born 1941), American ceramics artist
Rick Shaw (journalist) (born 1956), American journalist and educator
Bushwick Bill (Richard Stephen Shaw, 1966–2019), American rapper and member of Houston rap group Geto Boys
Richard Shaw, British guitarist with Cradle of Filth

See also
 Rick Shaw (disambiguation)